Callionymus obscurus, the obscure dragonet, is a species of dragonet native to the Pacific waters off of Indonesia where it is found at depths down to .

References 

O
Fish described in 1989